56 Brook Green is a Grade II listed building at 56 Brook Green, Hammersmith, London, W6 7BJ.

The house dates from the mid-19th century. It was lived in by the printmaker and artist Frank Short.

References

Grade II listed houses in London
Grade II listed buildings in the London Borough of Hammersmith and Fulham
Houses in the London Borough of Hammersmith and Fulham
Houses completed in the 19th century